Deepika Padukone is an Indian actress who prominently works in Hindi films. Padukone is considered as one of the most awarded actresses from 2007's as she is the recipient of 80 accolades into her credit respectively. She has received three Filmfare Awards, three IIFA, two Producers Guild Film Awards, nine Screen Awards, three Stardust Awards and six Zee Cine Awards. In addition to film awards, Padukone has topped various listings of India's most attractive people, including The Times of Indias "Most Desirable Woman", Maxims "Hot 100", FHM (India)s "World's Sexiest Woman" and People (India)s "Most Beautiful Woman".

After her film debut in the 2006 Kannada film Aishwarya, Padukone entered Bollywood through the blockbuster reincarnation drama Om Shanti Om (2007), for which she received Best Debut awards at various ceremonies including the Filmfare Award for Best Female Debut and received her first Filmfare Award for Best Actress nomination. At the 3rd Asian Film Awards, she received a nomination for Best Actress for her role in the action comedy Chandni Chowk to China (2009). Her performances in the romantic comedy-dramas Love Aaj Kal (2009) and Cocktail (2012) earned her recognition at various award ceremonies, including nominations for Best Actress at Filmfare and IIFA. For the latter, she was awarded the Smita Patil Memorial Award for Best Actor.

Padukone's performances in her four releases of 2013 earned her various accolades. She was nominated for the Filmfare and the Producers Guild Film Award for Best Actress in a Leading Role and won the IIFA Jodi of the Year (along with Ranbir Kapoor) for the blockbuster romantic comedy-drama Yeh Jawaani Hai Deewani (2013). She subsequently won Best Actress awards at the IIFA and Zee Cine awards and earned an additional Filmfare Best Actress nomination for her performance of a Tamil girl on the run in the blockbuster romantic comedy Chennai Express (2013). She also received her first Filmfare Award for Best Actress for her role of a Gujarati girl based on William Shakespeare's Juliet character in the tragic romance Goliyon Ki Raasleela Ram-Leela (2013). Her performances in the satirical road comedy Finding Fanny (2014) and the heist comedy Happy New Year (2014) earned her the Stardust Award for Star of the Year – Female. The following year, she received various accolades for her role as a Bengali architect in the comedy-drama Piku, including her second Best Actress award at the Filmfare, Screen, Producers Guild and IIFA awards along with the Zee Cine Award for Best Actress (Critics). Additionally, Padukone won Stardust Award for Best Actress for her performances in Piku and the romantic drama Tamasha (2015). That same year, for her role as Mastani in the historical romantic drama Bajirao Mastani (2015), she received additional Best Actress nominations from the Filmfare, IIFA, Producers Guild Awards and won the Zee Cine Award for Best Actress.

In 2022, she was awarded the Time 100 Impact Award for the second time, previously awarded in 2018 for "100 Most Influential People". She was the only Indian woman to be on the 2018 list and became the first Indian personality to be honoured by the Time Magazine twice. She also created a Guinness World Record in 2019.

Asian Film Awards 
The Asian Film Awards are presented annually by the Hong Kong International Film Festival society to recognize excellence of those in the Asian film industry. Padukone has received two nominations.

BIG Star Entertainment Awards
The BIG Star Entertainment Awards is an annual event organised by the Reliance Broadcast Network. Padukone has won six awards from sixteen nominations.

CNN-IBN Indian of the Year
The CNN-IBN Indian of the Year is an award presented annually by CNN-IBN since 2006 to Indians who have been judged to have helped strengthen society and build Brand India during the year. Padukone has received one award from two nominations.

ETC Bollywood Business Awards 
The ETC Bollywood Business Awards are presented annually by ETC Bollywood Business to award Bollywood films. This is the only award in India which judges films based on their box-office performances.

Filmfare Awards
The Filmfare Awards is one of the oldest and most prominent Hindi film award ceremonies. They are presented annually by The Times Group to honour both artistic and technical excellence. Padukone has won three awards from 10 nominations.

Indian Film Festival of Melbourne 
The Indian Film Festival of Melbourne (IFFM) is an annual Indian film festival based in Melbourne, Australia. It is presented by Film Victoria and the State Government of Victoria, and produced by Mind Blowing Films, a Melbourne-based distributor of Indian cinema across Australia and New Zealand. Padukone has received five nominations.

International Indian Film Academy Awards
The International Indian Film Academy Awards (IIFA Awards) are organised by Wizcraft International Entertainment Pvt. Ltd. to honour members of the Bollywood film industry. Padukone has received seven awards from fifteen nominations.

NDTV Indian of the Year
The NDTV Indian of the Year is an annual award presented by NDTV. Padukone has received two awards.

People's Choice Awards India
The People's Choice Awards India is the Indian version of the American awards show recognising Indian film, television, music and sports. Padukone has received one nomination.

Producers Guild Film Awards
The Producers Guild Film Awards (previously known as the Apsara Film & Television Producers Guild Awards) are presented by the Producers Guild to honour and recognise the professional excellence of their peers. Padukone has received five awards from eleven nominations.

Screen Awards
The Star Screen Awards is a yearly ceremony honouring professional excellence in the Hindi language film industry. Padukone has won ten awards from sixteen nominations.

Stardust Awards
The Stardust Awards are presented by Stardust magazine. They honour professional excellence in the Hindi film industry. Padukone has won three awards from thirteen nominations.

Asiavision Awards 
The Asiavision Awards have been held annually since 2006 to honor the artistes and technicians of Indian cinema and television. Padukone has received one award from this event.

Teen Choice Awards 
The Teen Choice Awards is an annual US award ceremony show that airs on the Fox Network. The awards honor the year's biggest achievements in music, movies, sports, television, fashion and other categories, voted by teen viewers.

Cosmopolitan Fun Fearless Awards 
The  Cosmopolitan Fun Fearless Awards is the annual spectacular toasts achievers, year was a veritable roster of success. Padukone has received two awards respectively.

Zee Cine Awards
The Zee Cine Awards are presented by Zee Entertainment Enterprises for the Hindi film industry. The awards were inaugurated in 1998 and are a mixture of categories decided on by public votes and by an industry jury. The awards were not presented in 2009 and 2010, but were resumed from 2011. Padukone has won seven awards from Fourteen nominations.

Nickelodeon Kids' Choice Awards India
The Nickelodeon Kids' Choice Awards India is the Indian version of the American awards show recognising Indian Film, TV, Music and Sports.

International honors and media titles

References

External links
 

Padukone, Deepika